Greenply Industries Limited (GIL) is India's largest interior infrastructure company. The company is listed on the National Stock Exchange (NSE) and the Bombay Stock Exchange. It has a net consolidated turnover of ₨ 2044 crores  for the financial year 2012–2013. Greenply manufacturers various interior infrastructure products such as plywood, block board, decorative laminates, decorative veneers, medium-density fiberboards (MDF), Laminate flooring and restroom cubicles. It has 45 branches all across India and presence in more than 300 cities with more than 13,000 distributors, dealers, sub-dealers and retailers. The company has its registered office in Tinsukia, Assam and corporate office in Kolkata.

History
The company was established as "Mittal Laminates Private Limited" on 28 November 1990. It became a Mittal Laminates Limited in 1994, and finally Greenply Industries Limited in 1996. Its first manufacturing plant was established in 1993 at Behror, Rajasthan, followed by one at Pantnagar, Uttarakhand in 2006. Prior to which a manufacturing unit of erstwhile Greenply Industries Limited  at Tizit, Nagaland was taken over, along with the company itself in 1995.
Mobile No. 09410005507 Greenply Industries Limited

Executive Chairman
Shiv Prakash Mittal is the Founder of Greenply Industries Ltd. and has been serving as its chairman since February 2007. He earned his bachelor's degree in science from the University of Calcutta and has more than 35 years of experience in the plywood and laminate industry. He serves as a Chairman of Greenlam industries  as well as Director of Greenpanel Industries Limited, Greenply Leasing and Finance, Prime Holdings Private Limited, Prime Properties, Greenlam Asia Pacific, Galaxy Decor, and Platinum Veneers.

Board of directors

Shobhan Mittal

Shobhan Mittal is currently the CEO and joint-Managing Director of Greenply Industries Limited. In February 2015, Greenply Industries Limited announced the appointment of Shobhan Mittal as the CEO and joint-Managing Director of the company. 

Shobhan Mittal served as the Executive Chairman of Greenply from September, 2006 till the time he was promoted to the new post.

Others Board of Directors at Greenply Industries Limited

Others Board of Directors at Greenply Industries Limited

 Shiv Prakash Mittal – Executive Chairman
 Rajesh Mittal – Managing Director
 Moina Yometh Konyak – Director
 Susil Kumar Pal – Director
 Sonali Bhagwati Dalal – Director
 Anupam Kumar Mukherji – Director
 Vinod Kumar Kothari – Director
 Upendra Nath Challu – Director
 09410005507 greenply industries Ltd

References

External links
 

Building materials companies
Manufacturing companies based in Kolkata
Companies based in Assam
Indian companies established in 1990
Manufacturing companies established in 1990
Companies listed on the National Stock Exchange of India
Companies listed on the Bombay Stock Exchange
1990 establishments in West Bengal